Teodor Popescu was a non-starter Romanian bobsledder who competed in the 1930s. He won a silver medal in the four-man event at the 1934 FIBT World Championships in Garmisch-Partenkirchen.

At the 1936 Winter Olympics in Garmisch-Partenkirchen, Popescu was listed in the four-man event, but did not compete.

He has had at least one book written about him called Flying with Both Wings: The life of Teodor Popescu written by Horia Azimoria ('Mit beiden Flügeln fliegen' in its original written language, Romanian). It describes his life being born as  son of an orthodox priest, studying theology, and eventually becoming an orthodox priest himself. He is described as the 'Martin Luther of Romania'

Teodor was married to his wife Athena (last name unknown), for an unknown period of time until she died, sparking a crisis in his life, causing him to read the Christian bible. This brought him to the realization that salvation can only be found through Jesus Christ.

After his religious conversion, he began to preach Christianity, under many reprisals from the Communist government and resistance from within the church.

References
 1936 bobsleigh four-man results
 1936 Olympic Winter Games official report. - p. 416.
 Bobsleigh four-man world championship medalists since 1930
 Mit beiden Flügeln fliegen (Flying with Both Wings: The life of Teodor Popescu)'

External links
 

Bobsledders at the 1936 Winter Olympics
Olympic bobsledders of Romania
Possibly living people
Romanian male bobsledders
Year of birth missing

Romanian bobsledders
Olympic bobsledders
1936 Winter Olympics